The 2017–18 Basketbol Süper Ligi (BSL), for sponsorship reasons named Tahincioğlu Basketbol Süper Ligi, was the 52nd season of the top-tier professional basketball league in Turkey. Fenerbahçe won their 9th Basketbol Süper Ligi title and their 12th Turkish title overall by defeating Tofaş 4–1 in the finals.

Teams

Promotion and relegation
Best Balıkesir and TED Ankara Kolejliler were relegated after finishing in the 15th and 16th places last season. Eskişehir Basket was promoted as the runner-up, and Sakarya BB was promoted as the champions of the 2016–17 TBL season.

Locations and stadia

Regular season
In the regular season, teams play against each other four times home-and-away in a round-robin format. The eight first qualified teams advance to the playoffs. The last two teams in the table are relegated to the second tier TBL. The regular season started on 7 October 2017.

League table

Results

Playoffs

Awards and statistics

Statistical leaders

Turkish clubs in European competitions

References

External links

Official Site
TBLStat.net History Page

Turkish Basketball Super League seasons
Turkish
1